Karvansara or Karavansara or Karevansera may refer to:
Amre Taza, Armenia
Karvansara, Gegharkunik, Armenia
Ijevan, Armenia
Karvansara, Khuzestan, Iran
Karvansara, Markazi, Iran
Karvansara, Naqadeh, West Azerbaijan Province, Iran
Karvansara, Urmia, West Azerbaijan Province, Iran
Karvansara, Zanjan, Iran
Karvansara-ye Olya, Iran
Karvansara-ye Sofla, Iran

See also
Caravanserai